The Saite Oracle Papyrus is a papyrus from the Late Period of Egypt that shows a man petitioning for his father to be allowed to leave the priesthood of his temple and join that of a neighboring city (Montu-Re-Horakhty). In the image, the precession of the god Amun-Re can be seen, with parts of his shrine visible above the carrying poles held by priests.

See also
 List of ancient Egyptian papyri

References

Egyptian papyri containing images